Russell Vincent (born 25 March 1954) is an Australian cricketer. He played in three first-class matches for South Australia in 1976/77.

See also
 List of South Australian representative cricketers

References

External links
 

1954 births
Living people
Australian cricketers
South Australia cricketers
Cricketers from Adelaide